"Hands Up" is the only single from Lloyd Banks's second album, Rotten Apple. The chorus is sung by fellow G-Unit rapper 50 Cent. "Hands Up" peaked at #84 on the Billboard Hot 100. The song is produced by Eminem and was released as a digital download on July 25, 2006.  It is also included on the soundtrack for the video game Saints Row 2.

Music video
The music video debuted on BET. The music video features cameos from 50 Cent and Tony Yayo, along with Mobb Deep. The video was filmed in an old warehouse, which had been turned into a club. The video was released as a digital download on July 28, 2006.

Charts

References

2006 singles
Lloyd Banks songs
50 Cent songs
Songs written by 50 Cent
Songs written by Eminem
Song recordings produced by Eminem
Songs written by Lloyd Banks
2006 songs
G-Unit Records singles
Interscope Records singles
Songs written by Luis Resto (musician)